The Certified Wireless Network Administrator (CWNA) is a foundation level certification from the CWNP that measures the ability to administer any wireless LAN. A wide range of topics focusing on the 802.11 wireless LAN technology are covered in the coursework and exam, which is vendor neutral.

Certification track 
The Certified Wireless Network Administrator (CWNA) is a foundation level wireless certification for the Certified Wireless Network Professional (CWNP) program. The CWNP next offers three professional level certifications: Certified Wireless Security Professional (CWSP), Certified Wireless Analysis Professional (CWAP) and Certified Wireless Design Professional (CWDP). A candidate can only achieve the expert level CWNE certification after earning the CWNA, CWSP, CWAP and CWDP certifications. A candidate no longer has to pass an exam for the expert level Certified Wireless Network Expert (CWNE) certification. In addition to passing the CWNA, CWSP, CWAP and CWDP a candidate must also provide: 3 professional endorsements, 3 years of documented enterprise Wi-Fi experience, 2 other current valid networking certifications and documentation of 3 enterprise Wi-Fi projects the candidate has participated in or led.

CWNA requirements 
The main subject areas covered by the CWNA are as follows:
Radio Technologies
Antenna Concepts
Wireless LAN hardware and software
Network Design Installation and Management
Wireless Standards and Organization
802.11 Network Architecture
Wireless LAN Security
Troubleshooting
How to perform site surveys

These subjects are covered at an introductory level in the CWNA coursework and examination. The other certifications specialize in one or more of these subjects.

Recertification 
The CWNA certification is valid for three years. The certification may be renewed by retaking the CWNA exam or by passing one of the 3 professional level certification exams (CWSP, CWAP or CWDP).

See also
Professional certification (Computer technology)

References

External links

Sybex Publishing Study Guide: https://www.wiley.com/go/cwnasg
Wireless networking
Information technology qualifications